Ahmet Mekin (born Ahmet Kurteli, 6 August 1932) is a Turkish actor.

Biography
Ahmet Mekin was born as Ahmet Kurteli in Istanbul and began his career in theatre. He made his film debut in Mahşere Kadar in 1957 and went on to appear in nearly 200 films, among them Aşktan da Üstün, Kelebekler Çift Uçar, Bir Türk'e Gönül Verdim, Düğün and Selvi Boylum Al Yazmalım. He is married to actress Şükran Sabuncu.

Selected filmography
Aşktan da Üstün (1960)
Kelebekler Çift Uçar (1964)
Urfa İstanbul (1968)
Bir Türk'e Gönül Verdim (1969)
Çaresizler (1973)
Düğün (1974)
Bir Adam Yaratmak (1977)
Selvi Boylum Al Yazmalım (1977)
Kanun Kanundur (1984)
Ateş Dağlı (1985)
Kavanozdaki Adam (1987)
Kuruluş (1987)

References

External links
 

1932 births
Living people
Male actors from Istanbul
Turkish male film actors
Turkish male television actors
Turkish male stage actors